The Karisaka Tunnel is a Japanese toll tunnel that opened April 23, 1998 between Chichibu, Saitama Prefecture and Yamanashi City, Yamanashi Prefecture.  Until this tunnel opened, there was no direct road connection between Saitama and Yamanashi prefectures.

Details 
 At 6,625m long, the tunnel is the fifth-longest road tunnel in Japan.
 Tolls are collected when traveling north from Yamanashi to Saitama.
 Equipped with fire-prevention equipment
 Built using the New Austrian Tunneling method
 Pedestrians, bicycles, and specialized small vehicles are prohibited.
 50cc motorbikes can be ridden through the tunnel.
 Hazardous cargo is restricted.

References

External links 
 
 

Roads in Saitama Prefecture
Roads in Yamanashi Prefecture
Toll tunnels in Japan
Toll roads in Japan
Tunnels completed in 1998
Buildings and structures in Saitama Prefecture
Buildings and structures in Yamanashi Prefecture
Yamanashi, Yamanashi